Knox Township is a township in Pottawattamie County, Iowa, USA.

History
Knox Township was organized in 1855.

References

Townships in Pottawattamie County, Iowa
Townships in Iowa